The Ensenadan age is a period of geologic time (1.2–0.8 Ma) within the Early Pleistocene epoch of the Quaternary used more specifically with South American Land Mammal Ages. It follows the Uquian and precedes the Lujanian age.

References 

 
Pleistocene life
Calabrian (stage)
Quaternary animals of South America
.001Ensenadan